Samuel Kroon (born 28 November 1996) is a Swedish football midfielder who plays for IF Brommapojkarna.

References

1996 births
Living people
Swedish footballers
Association football midfielders
Nyköpings BIS players
Umeå FC players
Halmstads BK players
Ettan Fotboll players
Superettan players
Allsvenskan players